The Vargas Formation is a sedimentary formation on the left bank of Palena River in the western Patagonian Andes of southern Chile. The formation is made of black shale and sandstone that deposited in the Late Oligocene or Early Miocene epoch some 26 million years ago. The formation has contact across a fault plane with granitoids of Cretaceous age of the North Patagonian Batholith.

The exposures of Vargas Formation are small and its fossils poorly preserved. Gastropods, bivalves, echinoderms, and planktic foraminifer fossils have been found in the formation.

Hans Steffen was the first to investigate Vargas Formation with his research being published in 1944.

See also 

 Geology of Chile
 Chaicayán Group
 Ayacara Formation
 La Cascada Formation
 Puduhuapi Formation

References 

Geologic formations of Chile
Miocene Series of South America
Oligocene Series of South America
Chattian Stage
Aquitanian (stage)
Burdigalian
Neogene Chile
Paleogene Chile
Sandstone formations
Shale formations
Geology of Los Lagos Region